Charles Reiter (born February 27, 1988 in New York, New York) is an American former professional soccer player for the Richmond Kickers in the USL and Pali Blues in the USL Premier Development League.

Personal life
Reiter was born in New York City into a Jewish family. His hometown is Westport, Connecticut.

Career

Youth and college
Reiter attended IMG in Bradenton, Florida for his senior year of high school.

In 2007 Reiter also played two seasons with the Bradenton Academics in the USL Premier Development League.

He played college soccer at Davidson College where he was a political science major. In 2009 in college he was ranked sixth nationally in points per game (1.78), eighth in goals per game (0.67) and 29th in assists per game (0.44) He was also voted Southern Conference Player of the Year by the league’s coaches, First-team on National Soccer Coaches Association of America (NSCAA) All-South Region team, All-Southern Conference team and North Carolina Collegiate Sports Information Association (NCCSIA) All-State team, and named a CoSIDA/ESPN the Magazine First-Team Academic All-American and a NSCAA/Adidas First-Team Scholar All-American. He played every match in his Davidson career.

During his junior year, he was a member of the US men's squad for the 2009 Maccabiah Games in Israel. A year later Reiter was named to Jewish Sports Review's All-America collegiate team, on a team that included goalkeeper Zac MacMath.

Professional
Reiter signed with the Kickers on March 10, 2010, after impressing in a trial with the club. Reiter made his professional debut on April 17, 2010, in a league match against Harrisburg City Islanders.

Career statistics

See also
List of select Jewish football (association; soccer) players

References

External links
 Davidson bio

1988 births
Living people
People from Westport, Connecticut
Jewish American sportspeople
Association football forwards
American soccer players
Maccabiah Games competitors for the United States
Maccabiah Games footballers
Davidson College alumni
IMG Academy Bradenton players
Richmond Kickers players
OC Pateadores Blues players
USL League Two players
USL Second Division players
Davidson Wildcats men's soccer players
Simpson Thacher & Bartlett associates
UCLA School of Law alumni
Soccer players from Connecticut
Orange County SC U-23 players
Sportspeople from Fairfield County, Connecticut
21st-century American Jews